Ihsan Sacko (born 19 July 1997) is a French professional footballer who plays as a midfielder for  club Avranches.

Club career
Sacko is a youth exponent of RC Strasbourg Alsace. He made his first team debut on 8 January 2016 against ASM Belfort replacing Dimitri Liénard after 76 minutes in a 2–0 home win.

On 5 September 2020, he joined Italian club Cosenza on a season-long loan.

On 1 August 2022, Sacko signed a two-year contract with Avranches.

Personal life
Sacko was born in France and is of Malian descent.

References

1997 births
Living people
French footballers
French people of Malian descent
Association football midfielders
Ligue 1 players
Ligue 2 players
Championnat National players
Championnat National 2 players
Championnat National 3 players
Serie B players
RC Strasbourg Alsace players
OGC Nice players
ES Troyes AC players
Cosenza Calcio players
US Avranches players
French expatriate footballers
Expatriate footballers in Italy
French expatriate sportspeople in Italy
People from Alfortville
Footballers from Val-de-Marne